Kehinde "Kenny" Ogungbe, is a Nigerian DJ, music producer, television presenter and music executive. He is the founder and eponym of the label Kennis Music, and is the CEO alongside Dayo "D1" Adeneye. They own Kennis 104.1 F.M, Lagos.

Career
Together with Dayo Adeneye also known as D1, he hosted the music programme AIT Jamz, which aired on AIT in the late nineties (later becoming PrimeTime Jamz on NTA).

He has worked with, shaped the careers of, or discovered The Remedies (launching the solo careers of both Eedris Abdulkareem and Tony Tetuila), Sound Sultan, 2face Idibia (producing his first two solo albums) and Oritse Femi, among others.

In 2012, he was appointed Managing Director of Raypower FM. He is also Non Executive Director, DAAR Communications Plc.

Selected discography
(As producer)
Face 2 Face
 Grass 2 Grace

References

External links
Profile @ Bloomberg
CNN Highlights Nigeria’s Hip-Hop Industry, BellaNaija (report features interview with Ogungbe). 
YouTube video of same report
Kenny Ogungbe: the godfather, profile at Africa Magic

Nigerian radio presenters
Nigerian television presenters
Nigerian record producers
Yoruba television personalities
Yoruba radio personalities
Living people
1970 births